Daniel James Phillips (born March 5, 1973), better known by his stage name DJP, is an American DJ and turntablist from Springfield, Missouri. He is best known as one of the pioneers of "mash-ups” formally known as “blending”, a style of blending different genres and eras of music that became popular in the early 2000s.

In 1999 DJP competed in and won the midwest regional DMC Championships in Lawrence, Kansas and went on to compete at the 1999 DMC U.S. Finals held at San Francisco's Palace Of Fine Arts. Though he did not win, his routine included using classic rock tracks like Tom Petty's "Don't Come Around Here No More" and Bruce Hornsby's "The Way It Is," as well as breakdancing. That year, he also toured with MTV's Campus Invasion Tour with Garbage and Lit.

In 2001, DJP collaborated with DJ Z-Trip from Phoenix, Arizona to create the "Uneasy Listening, Vol. 1" mix CD, which paired classic and '80s rock tracks with hiphop staples, like Phil Collins' "In the Air Tonight" mixed with Del the Funkee Homosapien's "Phoney Phranchise." Though its original pressing was limited to 1000 promotional-only copies, within a year the mix had been widely copied and shared across the internet, and became something of a cult classic for its pioneering of the "mashup" style of combining songs from different genres and eras. "Uneasy Listening, Vol. 1" eventually appearing on many critics' year-end top ten lists in the likes of Rolling Stone, Spin, Entertainment Weekly, URB, the Los Angeles Times and The New York Times.

In 2003, DJP toured U.S. as with the band 311 from Omaha, Nebraska as their supporting DJ.

In 2005 DJP relocated to Las Vegas to be a resident DJ at the MGM Grand Casino playing its Studio 54 and Tabu Ultra Lounge venues. Along with DJ AM, DJP was named one of the city's top Hip-Hop DJ by City Life Magazine. In 2007, DJP signed a two-year contract with the Palms Casino playing its Club Moon, Ghost Bar and Playboy Club.

During that time he was also inducted into the American Hip Hop group Rock Steady Crew and collaborated with breakdance pioneer Mr. Freeze. He toured the U.S. with DJ Jazzy Jeff and Gangstarr's DJ Premier as part of a tour sponsored by Toyota's Scion car company.

In 2011, DJP appeared as a contestant on the second season of the BET reality show "Master of the Mix" sponsored by Smirnoff Vodka. DJP distinguished himself by using vinyl records for many of the challenge events, while his competitors used mostly computer-based digital formats. DJP won the first place title of "Master of the Mix," earning a $250,000 price and a year contract with Smirnoff where he was featured at promotional appearances.

Since 2008, DJP has been based back in his hometown of Springfield, and continues to travel all over the United States. In recent years he has produced works such as his collaboration album “The Butterfly” with underground rapper Btween as well as his solo album “Any Way You Want It” released during the pandemic. The album “Any Way You Want It” was recently pressed on vinyl as an LP in 2022. In 2020 he also released “Uneasy Listening Vol. 2 - The Waffle House Edition” on vinyl.

References

External links

Living people
1973 births
Musicians from Missouri
American DJs